The 2023 Eliteserien will be the 79th season of top-tier football in Norway.

The season is set to start on 10 April 2023 and end on 2 December 2023, not including play-off matches.

Molde are the defending champions. Brann and Stabæk joined as the promoted clubs from the 2022 Norwegian First Division. They replaced Kristiansund and Jerv who were relegated to the 2023 Norwegian First Division.

Teams
Sixteen teams compete in the league – the top fourteen teams from the previous season, and two teams promoted from the First Division. The promoted teams were Brann and Stabæk, both returning to the top flight after a season's absence. They replaced Kristiansund and Jerv, ending their top flight spells of six years and one year respectively.

Stadiums and locations

''Note: Table lists in alphabetical order.

Personnel and kits

Managerial changes

Transfers

Winter

Summer

League table

Results

Relegation play-offs

The 14th-placed team in Eliteserien will face the winners of the First Division promotion play-offs over two legs to decide who will play in Eliteserien next season.

References

Eliteserien seasons
1
Norway
Norway
Scheduled association football competitions